Steven D. Lavine is an American academic administrator who was the president of the California Institute of the Arts. He stepped down from that position in June 2017, after 29 years in the post.

Early life 
Lavine was born in Sparta, Wisconsin. He earned a Bachelor of Arts degree from Stanford University, followed by a Master of Arts and PhD in English and American literature from Harvard University.

Career
Through the professional recommendation of Martin Friedman, then-director of the Walker Art Center, Lavine was put in contact with CalArts's Board of Trustees. In 1988, he was appointed its president, after serving as associate director for arts and humanities at the Rockefeller Foundation.

In 1991, with Ivan Karp, Lavine co-edited "Exhibiting Cultures: The Poetics and Politics of Museum Display".

CalArts 
As the third president of CalArts, Lavine oversaw the naming of The Sharon Disney Lund School of Dance, The Herb Alpert School of Music, and REDCAT, the Roy and Edna Disney CalArts Theater that opened in the Walt Disney Concert Hall in downtown Los Angeles.

Personal life
Lavine is married to writer and artist Janet Sternburg.

References

Living people
Harvard University alumni
Stanford University alumni
Heads of universities and colleges in the United States
1947 births